Cascajal is a Cuban village and consejo popular ("people's council", i.e. hamlet) of the municipality of Santo Domingo, in Villa Clara Province. With a 2011 population of 7,251, it is the most populated municipal settlement after Santo Domingo.

History
The village was founded in 1847, during the construction of the Central Railway (Ferrocarril Central), connecting Havana to Santiago de Cuba.

Geography
Cascajal lies west of its province, at the borders with the municipality of Los Arabos, in Matanzas Province, between Mayabón (7 km west) and Mordazo (9 km east). Nearest villages are Cayo Bejuco, 1 km southeast of it, and the little localities of Camilo Cienfuegos, Orbeta (both in Los Arabos) and Mi Cuba.

The village is 21 km far from Los Arabos and Manacas, 32 from Santo Domingo, 40 from Colón, 71 from Santa Clara, 96 from Cárdenas and 126 from Matanzas.

Transport
The village is crossed in the middle by the "Carretera Central" (CC) state highway, the longest one in the island. It counts a train station, served by regional trains, on the central Havana-Santa Clara-Camagüey-Santiago line.

See also
Municipalities of Cuba
List of cities in Cuba

References

External links

Populated places in Villa Clara Province
Populated places established in 1847
1847 establishments in North America